Tornadoes, cyclones, and other storms with strong winds damage or destroy many buildings. However, with proper design and construction, the damage to buildings by these forces can be greatly reduced. A variety of methods can help a building survive strong winds and storm surge.

Storm surge considerations

Waves along coastal areas can destroy many buildings. Buildings should preferably be built on high ground to avoid waves. If waves can reach the building site, the building should be elevated on steel, concrete, or wooden pilings or anchored to solid rock.

Wind loading considerations

The foundation

Wind on the roof surfaces can cause negative pressures that create a lifting force sufficient to lift the roof off the building. Once this occurs, the building is weakened considerably, and the rest will likely fail as well. To minimize this vulnerability, the upper structure ought to be anchored through the walls to the foundation.

Several methods can be used to anchor the roof. Typically, roof trusses are "toenailed" into the top of the walls, which provide insufficient force to resist high winds. Hurricane ties nail into the wall and wrap over the trusses to provide higher force resistance.

Mobile home tie down to the foundation
Interlocking metal pan roof systems installed on mobile homes can fail under the pressure differential (lift) created by the high-velocity winds passing over the surface plane of the roof. This is compounded by the wind entering the building allowing the building interior to pressurize, lifting the underside of the roof panels, resulting in the destruction of the building.  One example of pan roof systems can be found in this document from Structall Building Systems .

To mitigate this pressure differential, pre-installed aluminum tabular channels can be permanently fastened perpendicularly across the top of the interlocking ribs of the metal roof system without disturbing the flow of rainwater at the eaves mid-span and ridge locations of the building.

Earth-sheltering
Earth-sheltered construction is generally more resistant to strong winds and tornadoes than standard construction. Cellars and other earth-sheltered components of other buildings can provide safe refuge during tornadoes.

Dome homes

The physical geometry of a building affects its aerodynamic properties and how well it can withstand a storm. Geodesic dome roofs or buildings have low drag coefficients and can withstand higher wind forces than a square building of the same area. Even stronger buildings result from monolithic dome construction.

Log house

Wall logs in such construction must be made of glued laminated timber and all other components of the house, including hurricane straps, must be hurricane-resistant.

Round house
A round, or multiple-sided home, is more resistant to hurricane strength winds. The round design allows the wind to blow around the home, reducing the build-up of pressure on one side. Additionally, with the roof and floors built using a radial truss array, that allows any potential energy from sustained winds to disperse across the entire structure instead of building up in one area.

Building components
Building openings such as garage doors and windows are often weak points susceptible to failure by wind pressure and blowing debris. Once failure occurs, wind pressure builds up inside the building resulting in the roof lifting off the building. Hurricane shutters can provide protection.

Doors can be blown into the house by wind, causing potential structural failure (see http://www.floridadisaster.org/hrg/content/openings/openings_index.asp#Hinged_Exterior_Doors).

Windows can be constructed with plastic panes, shatterproof glass, or glass with protective membranes. The panes are often more firmly attached than normal window panes, including using screws or bolts through the edges of larger panes. Concrete anchor screws are used to secure windows to the concrete structure surrounding them.

Wood has a relatively high degree of flexibility, which can be beneficial under certain building stresses.

Reinforced concrete is a strong, dense material that can withstand the destructive power of very high winds and high-speed debris if used in a building that is designed properly.

Regulation
After Hurricane Andrew in 1992 caused $16 billion in insured damage, the state of Florida established new building standards and enforcement. The state increased performance criteria for wind-load provisions and adopted new wind provisions from the American Society of Civil Engineers. One important addition to the new code was the requirement of missile-impact resisting glass, which can withstand high-velocity impact from wind-borne debris during a hurricane. Many houses built in South Florida since Hurricane Andrew are cinder block masonry construction reinforced with concrete pillars, hurricane-strapped roof trusses, and codes requirements for adhesives and types of roofing. Florida also designated high velocity hurricane zones (i.e. High Velocity Hurricane Zone) with special requirements defined for Miami-Dade and Broward Counties.

Hong Kong requires many structures to withstand winds from typhoons.

Examples of cyclonic construction methods 
Residential construction in Darwin Northern Australia

See also

 Autonomous building
 Building
 Natural building
Bubble Houses (Hobe Sound, Florida)
Dymaxion house
Hurricane preparedness
Hurricane shutter
HurriQuake nail (for resisting hurricanes and earthquakes)
Structural engineering
Windstorm inspection

References 
Notes

External links
 house building in Northern Australia 2008 photographs.

Building engineering
Building
Coastal construction
Tropical cyclone preparedness
Buildings and structures